Wes Shoemyer (born March 30, 1961, in Hannibal, Missouri) is a former Senator for the eighteenth district of the Missouri Senate. The district includes all or portions of thirteen counties in northeast Missouri: Adair, Audain, Clark, Knox, Lewis, Marion, Monroe, Pike, Putnam, Ralls, Schuyler, Scotland, and Shelby.

Personal
Shoemyer was raised in Shelby County, Missouri and graduated from South Shelby R-IV High School in 1979. He attended the University of Missouri. Shoemyer and wife Cheryl live on their rural Monroe County farm with their three daughters and one son.

Political history
Shoemyer was elected to the Missouri House of Representatives in 2000 representing the 9th district. He won the 2006 election for the seat that was vacated by John Cauthorn. He defeated Bob Behnen, a former Representative for the second district of the Missouri House of Representatives. Shoemyer won by 1,842 votes, or 3.4%. In the 2010 general election, Shoemyer was defeated by Republican Brian Munzlinger.

References

External links
Missouri Senate - Wes Shoemyer official government website
 
Follow the Money - Wes Shoemyer
2008 2006 Missouri Senate campaign contributions
2004 2002 2000 Missouri House campaign contributions

1961 births
Living people
People from Hannibal, Missouri
University of Missouri alumni
Missouri Democrats
People from Clarence, Missouri